Ollamh Clanricarde was a hereditary post, held almost exclusively by members of the McEgan family.

An ollamh was the highest rank in the learned orders of law, poetry, or history.  These educated professionals, today grouped together in the popular consciousness as "bards", maintained  an oral tradition that pre-dated Christianization of Ireland. Clanricarde was a territory located in south Connacht.

 1438: Conchobar Mac Aedacain, ollav of Macwilliam of Clanrickard, died.

See also

 Ollamh Érenn
 Ollamh Tuisceairt
 Ollamh Airgialla
 Ollamh Ulaidh
 Ollamh Laigin
 Ollamh Osraighe
 Ollamh Desmumu
 Ollamh Thomond
 Ollamh Mumu
 Ollamh Ormond
 Cllamh Ui Maine
 Ollamh Connachta
 Ollamh Síol Muireadaigh
 Ollamh Ui Fiachrach

Sources

The Encyclopaedia of Ireland 2003; .
 Mac Dermot of Moylurg: The Story of a Connacht Family Dermot Mac Dermot, 1996.
A New History of Ireland VIII: A Chronology of Irish History to 1976 - A Companion to Irish History Part I edited by T.W. Moody, F.X. Martin and F.J. Byrne, 1982. 
The Celebrated Antiquary Nollaig O Muralie, Maynooth, 1996. 
Irish Leaders and Learning Through the Ages Fr. Paul Walsh, 2004. (ed. Nollaig O Muralie).

External links
List of Published Texts at CELT — University College Cork's Corpus of Electronic Texts

Irish chroniclers
Medieval Irish poets
Medieval Irish historians
Irish male poets